"Never Can Say Goodbye" is a song written by Clifton Davis and originally recorded by the Jackson 5. The song was originally written and intended for the Supremes; however, Motown decided it would be better for the Jackson 5. It was the first single released from the group's 1971 album Maybe Tomorrow, and was one of the group's most successful records. It has been covered numerous times, most notably in 1974 by Gloria Gaynor and in 1987 by British pop group The Communards.

The Jackson 5 original version
The recording features 11-year-old Michael Jackson singing a serious song about love, with accompaniment from his brothers. Although such a record was unusual for a teenage group, "Never Can Say Goodbye" was a number-two hit for three consecutive weeks on the Billboard Pop Singles chart, stuck behind Three Dog Night's "Joy to the World" (May 8–22, 1971), and a number-one hit on the Billboard Hot R&B/Hip-Hop Songs chart in the United States. In the United Kingdom, it reached number 33 on the UK Singles Chart.

Notable televised performances of the song by the Jackson 5 (and their newer incarnation, The Jacksons) include:
 The Flip Wilson Show, November 4, 1971 – this recording appears on the 2009 Jackson 5 CD I Want You Back! Unreleased Masters
 One More Time (Jackson 5 TV special), January 10, 1974
 The Tonight Show Starring Johnny Carson, April 4, 1974
 Cher, March 16, 1975
 The Jacksons, July 7, 1976
 Motown 25: Yesterday, Today, Forever, May 16, 1983

In addition, the song appeared on the animated TV show The Jackson 5ive in the episode "A Rare Pearl", which aired on January 15, 1972.

This version appears in the 1994 movie Crooklyn and on the second volume of its soundtrack album.

Charts

Weekly charts

Year-end charts

Isaac Hayes version

Isaac Hayes first recorded the song for his 1971 album Black Moses. Released as a single, this version reached number five on the Billboard R&B chart, number 19 on the Easy Listening chart, and number 22 on the Hot 100.  Hayes re-recorded the tune for the soundtrack of the 2008 film Soul Men, in which he appears alongside Samuel L. Jackson and Bernie Mac. The film's producers dedicated the 2008 version to Mac and Hayes, who both died before the project was released.

Gloria Gaynor version

A major version by Gloria Gaynor, re-imagined as a disco record in 1974, was a number-nine hit on the U.S. Pop Singles chart and went to number 34 on the Soul Singles chart. The Gloria Gaynor version became one of the defining recordings of the disco era.  Indeed, her version peaked at number two in the United Kingdom during January 1975, and number three in Canada, surpassing the Jackson Five's original recording in those nations.

Gaynor's cover, released on MGM records, was produced by the Disco Corporation of America, a production company newly formed by Meco Monardo and Tony Bongiovi to which Gaynor was signed. Also working on this production were Jay Ellis and Harold Wheeler.

Gaynor's cover has the distinction of occupying the number-one spot on the first Dance/Disco chart to appear in Billboard magazine. Never Can Say Goodbye was also the title of Gaynor's debut album on which the single appeared.

Gaynor has re-recorded the song on more than one occasion, in increasingly fast tempos, and subsequent remixes have hit the dance charts.

Gaynor's version of the song was heard on the TV series Charmed ("That '70s Episode"), and is featured on the video game series Just Dance 2015.

Charts

Weekly charts

Year-end charts

The Communards version

In 1987, British band the Communards had a hit with a hi-NRG cover of the song, which was featured on their second album, Red.

Their version reached number one in Spain and number two in Ireland, number four on the UK Singles Chart, number 51 on the U.S. Billboard Hot 100, and number two on the Billboard Hot Dance/Disco chart in the U.S. The group had reached number one on those charts covering another 1970s classic, "Don't Leave Me This Way", in 1986. The cover was also a top 10 hit in several European countries and New Zealand.

A music video was produced for this version of the song, directed by Andy Morahan.

The Communards version of the song was used as the signature tune to the 2013 British comedy series Vicious.

Charts

Weekly charts

Year-end charts

Other versions
Other artists who have covered the song include:
 Mark Lindsay, on the 1971 album You've Got A Friend
 Grant Green, on the 1971 album Visions
 Andy Williams, on the 1971 album You've Got a Friend
 Herbie Mann, on the 1971 album Push Push
 Johnny "Hammond" Smith, on the 1971 album Breakout
 The Sandpipers, on the 1971 album A Gift of Song
 Junior Walker, on the 1971 album Moody Jr.
 Stevie Wonder, performed a Talkbox medley of the songs "Close To You" and  "Never Can Say Goodbye" on the David Frost Show in 1972.  He performed the song again in 2009 as a tribute to Michael Jackson.
 Rahsaan Roland Kirk, on the 1972 album Blacknuss
 Smokey Robinson, on the 1973 album Smokey
 Paloma San Basilio, in her debut album “Sombras”, included a version in Spanish called No Puedes Volver A Mí in 1975.
 Cal Tjader, on the 1973 album Last Bolero in Berkeley
 Former Ladies of the Supremes, on the 1995 album Supremely Yours
 Zachary Breaux, on the 1997 album Uptown Groove
 Yazz, on the 1997 album The Natural Life
 Gloria Estefan, as part of the "70's Moment Medley", a b-side to her 1998 single "Don't Let This Moment End"
 Sheena Easton, on the 2000 album Fabulous
 The Supremes, originally recorded for the shelved 1971 album Promises Kept, finally released on the 2002 album The '70s Anthology
 Vanessa Williams, featuring George Benson, on the 2005 album Everlasting Love
 David Benoit, on the 2008 covers album Heroes
 Gerald Albright, on the 2009 album Sax for Stax
 Bob Baldwin featuring Chuck Loeb, on the 2009 album Lookin' Back
 Olivia Ong, on the 2010 album Olivia
 David T. Walker, on the 1973 album David T. Walker
 Westlife performed the song live in 2001 for BBC Children in Need. 
 Frank Ocean covered the song as a medley alongside "Close To You" during his Blonde Tour in Summer 2017, It was inspired by Stevie Wonder's medley from 1972.
 Jack Stratton of Vulfpeck performed a version of the song with bassist Solomon Dorsey and original guitarist David T. Walker on the 2022 album Vulf Vault 006: Here We Go Jack. Walker played a chord melody to lead the song.

Television, film, and stage performances
Nicole Kidman sings a few lines of the song in the animated film Happy Feet (2006)
Will Ferrell sang the song on the first episode of The Tonight Show with Conan O'Brien
Jorge Núñez sang the song on the top 13 show on American Idol season 8
 The song is used in the Broadway musical Disaster. 
 A cover sung in Vietnamese by Khánh Hà plays in Gleaming the Cube.
 Loretta Devine sings a near 2 minute version of the song in an episode of Ally McBeal

Glee
Dianna Agron covered the song in 2012 during the eleventh episode of the third season of the American musical television series Glee, entitled "Michael". The performance received mostly positive reviews. Jen Chaney of The Washington Post gave the song a "B−", and said it "worked much better than every track that preceded it" because it adapted the song to the show "instead of trying to out-Jackson Jackson". Entertainment Weekly Joseph Brannigan Lynch called it "a nice summation of her character's journey, but not vocally impressive enough to justify listening to outside of the episode" and gave it a "B". Crystal Bell of HuffPost TV described it as a "blah performance", but Kate Stanhope of TV Guide said it was "sweet and reflective". Erica Futterman of Rolling Stone wrote that it was "a tune well-suited for Quinn's sultry voice and the flipped meaning she gives the lyrics", and TVLine Michael Slezak had a similar take: he gave it an "A" and called it a "remarkably lovely fit" for her voice.

Samples and remixes
The Neptunes remixed "Never Can Say Goodbye" on the 2009 Michael Jackson remix album The Remix Suite.

Astro rapped over the song on a 2011 episode of The X Factor USA.

In 2012, Wu-Tang Clan rapper Raekwon released his cover version of the song in which he raps over the instrumental.

In popular culture
While appearing on The Hollywood Squares Clifton Davis sang a bit of the song a capella and then was asked who wrote the song.  His answer was "I did" to which the contestant agreed (and was correct).

Personnel
Written by Clifton Davis

"Never Can Say Goodbye" was originally copyrighted on June 10, 1970 [EU0000187089] and then was copyrighted again on December 21, 1970 [EP0000281027].

The Jackson 5
Lead vocals: Michael Jackson
Background vocals: Jackie Jackson, Tito Jackson, Jermaine Jackson and Marlon Jackson
Produced by Hal Davis
Instrumentation by various Los Angeles studio musicians including David T. Walker

Gloria Gaynor

Lead vocals: Gloria Gaynor
Produced by the Disco Corporation of America (Meco Monardo, Tony Bongiovi, Jay Ellis producers; Harold Wheeler arranger)

References

External links
 
 

Songs about parting
1971 singles
1971 songs
1974 singles
1987 singles
Andy Williams songs
Cashbox number-one singles
The Communards songs
Disco songs
Gloria Gaynor songs
Isaac Hayes songs
The Jackson 5 songs
London Records singles
MCA Records singles
Metronome Records singles
MGM Records singles
Motown singles
Music videos directed by Andy Morahan
Number-one singles in Spain
Song recordings produced by Stephen Hague
Song recordings produced by Tony Bongiovi
Songs written by Clifton Davis
Soul ballads
Yazz songs